Mark L. Walberg (born August 31, 1962) is an American actor, television personality, and game show host best known for hosting Antiques Roadshow, Temptation Island, and the game shows Russian Roulette on GSN and The Moment of Truth on Fox.

Career 

From September 1995 to May 1996, Walberg hosted his own American syndicated tabloid talk show, The Mark Walberg Show.

Walberg is on the board of directors of Goodwill Southern California and the board of managers of the Hollywood/Wilshire YMCA. He plays on the World Poker Tour in the Hollywood Home Games for the Goodwill Industries of Southern California.

On the series finale episode (and also as an April Fools Day episode, as in which he is also a contestant in Lingo, playing for charity) on April 1, 2003, Walberg hosted Friend or Foe?.  His other game shows included Russian Roulette, also on Game Show Network, who also appeared as an audience member in the April fools episode as a cameo, and the PAX-TV game show On the Cover.

He was slated to host a game show adaptation of the popular board game Trivial Pursuit: America Plays beginning in fall 2008. Although he hosted the pilot, he was unable to get out of his Fox contract and was replaced by Christopher Knight when the series debuted.

In 2010, Walberg hosted a series on CMT titled Your Chance to Dance.

Walberg was the host of two television shows. In 2006, he joined the long-running PBS series, Antiques Roadshow. While staying with the show through many changes in formatting, he left the show after season 23 in 2019. The Game Plane, the first game show which is shot on an airplane in flight, debuted on Discovery Family channel in 2014.

In 2011, he made a cameo on West Coast Report. Walberg has also been a spokesperson for 23andMe.

He is the current host of The Price Is Right Live! and Temptation Island.

Filmography

Television

Acting

Hosting

References

External links

PBS Antiques Roadshow
World Poker Tour Profile

1962 births
Male actors from South Carolina
American game show hosts
Game show announcers
Living people
People from Florence, South Carolina
American male television actors
20th-century American male actors
20th-century American Jews
The Young Americans members
21st-century American Jews
American Jews